Trönninge is a locality situated in Varberg Municipality, Halland County, Sweden, with 880 inhabitants in 2010.

Sports
The following sports clubs are located in Trönninge, Varberg Municipality:

 Trönninge BK

References 

Populated places in Halland County
Populated places in Varberg Municipality